This is a list of governors of Malmöhus County of Sweden from 1719 to its dissolution in 1996, when it was merged with Kristianstad County to form Skåne County.

Carl Gustaf Hård (1719–1727)
Johan Cronman (1727–1737)
Wilhelm Bennet (1737–1740)
Carl Georg Siöblad (1740–1754)
Georg Bogislaus Staël von Holstein (1754–1763)
Carl Adlerfelt (1764–1769)
Johan Cronhielm (1769–1772)
Reinhold Johan von Lingen (1772)
Bengt Gustaf Frölich (1772–1776)
Tage Thott (1776–1794)
Gustaf von Rosen (1794–1812)
Wilhelm af Klinteberg (1812–1829)
Jean Albrecht Berg von Linde (1829–1831)
Magnus Stackelberg (1831–1833)
Fredrik Posse (1834–1851)
Samuel von Troil (1851–1874)
Axel Gustav Adlercreutz (1874–1880)
Gotthard Wachtmeister (1880–1892)
Robert Dickson (1892–1902)
Gustaf Tornérhjelm (1902–1909)
Robert de la Gardie (1909–1925)
Fredrik Ramel (1925–1938)
Arthur Thomson (1939–1951)
Allan Vougt (1951–1953)
Gustav Adolf Widell (1953–1961)
Gösta Netzén (1961–1973)
Nils Hörjel (1973–1984)
Bertil Göransson (governor) (1984–1993)
Ann-Cathrine Haglund (1993–1996)

Malmö